Paradise and Back Again is the ninth studio album by Dutch recording artist Anouk. It was released on 21 November 2014 by Universal Music.

Track listing 
 "Cold Blackhearted Golddiggers"
 "She Is Beautiful"
 "Daddy"
 "Don't Wipe Us Out"
 "Looking For Love"
 "Last Goodbye"
 "Some Of Us"
 "Wigger"
 "Breath"
 "Smile & Shine"
 "Wish He Could See It All"
 "Places To Go" (bonus track)
 "You & I" (bonus track)
 "Feet On The Ground" (bonus track)

Charts

Weekly charts

Year-end charts

References 

2014 albums
Anouk (singer) albums